Bell Bottom is a 2021 Indian Hindi-language action thriller film directed by Ranjit M. Tewari. The film is written by Aseem Arrora and Parveez Sheikh, with production by Vashu Bhagnani, Jackky Bhagnani, Deepshikha Deshmukh and  Nikkhil Advani under their respective banners Pooja Entertainment and Emmay Entertainment. It stars Akshay Kumar as the lead character, with Vaani Kapoor, Lara Dutta and Huma Qureshi in an extended cameo appearance.  Bell Bottom is inspired from real life hijacking events in India by Khalistani terrorists during the 1980s, such as the Indian Airlines Flight 423, 405 and 421 hijackings.

Principal photography began on 20 August 2020. The film was wrapped up on 30 September in London. The film released in theatres on 19 August 2021 in 3D. The film received mixed reviews from critics, with praise for Kumar’s and Dutta’s performance, art direction, fast paced narration, screenplay, background music & cinematography but criticism for the low quality VFX shots in action sequences and weak climax. Such mixed reviews, combined with the second wave of COVID 19 and the ensuing lockdown across various states, made it a major commercial failure.

Plot
In 1984, Indian Airlines Flight 691 (resembling Indian Airlines Flight 421) is hijacked, the seventh such hijacking in India in five years, with all the previous ones ending in acquiescence to the hijackers' demands that other terrorists be freed and money be delivered. During her briefing, Prime Minister Indira Gandhi, frustrated at the lack of action taken on the matter, decides to allow a RAW agent code-named "Bell Bottom" to handle the case. As a "mere" clerk, he is already viewed with consternation by the other officials, and his deduction that the alleged masterminds, a Khalistan separatist group named "Azaadi Dal", are merely a front for Pakistan's ISI are rebuffed by them due to improving Indo-Pakistani relations. After the plane lands in Amritsar when he predicted it would land in Lahore, he is dismissed. However, his supervisor points out that he is an expert on hijackings and is motivated by personal experience.

In 1979, polymath Anshul Malhotra lives with his mother Raavi, an asthmatic who constantly visits his brother in London, and his wife Radhika. Her flight is hijacked by terrorists, but then-PM Morarji Desai and Pakistani President Muhammad Zia-ul-Haq negotiate and fulfill the hijackers demands in exchange for the hostages' release. However, Raavi dies, reportedly due to natural causes. Soon after, though, Anshul is abducted by RAW, who reveal that one of the hijackers, Daljeet "Doddy" Singh, had purposely withheld her inhaler, pusher her into the galley and thrown heavy blankets on her, increasing her suffering as she died. Anshul is given the offer to join RAW; he accepts and takes on the code-name Bell Bottom, with his cover to his wife being that he is an embassy officer. After his training, which showcases his extraordinary memory and improves his previously subpar physical skills, he is assigned to the hijacking desk. In 1983, he finds one of the hijackers while visiting his brother in London and tracks them; he raids their house with other RAW agents and captures three of them but the fourth, Doddy Singh, escapes.

Back in the present, the plane takes off from Amritsar and lands in Lahore, prompting Gandhi to order Anshul back in. He convinces her to "break script" and disallow the Pakistani side to send their negotiating team, and orders them not to refuel the plane. In response, Zia sends his minister to keep track of the situation. In Lahore, the minister replaces the hijacker with Doddy and supplies weapons and explosives. Correctly figuring that they will go to the Middle East to take advantage of their naivety in aerial terrorism, Anshul prepares for a covert operation in Dubai against the Indian ministers' wishes. Meanwhile, the Pakistani minister goes to Dubai to observe what is going on and guide Doddy.

Upon arrival, Anshul and his team, disguised as diplomatic aides, meet up with a contact in the Dubai airport, where they see Dubai's emphasis on humanitarianism and avoidance of bloodshed. Their first plan, covertly entering the aircraft and disarming the hijackers, is foiled when the Pakistani minister notices and closes the luggage door. Anshul's "plan B", sending in the Indian army, is also curtailed when the Dubai officials are notified and the ship they are on is denied entry. With all avenues cut off, the ministers go to negiotate; although they agree to the terrorists' demands of money, more terrorist releases, and a charter flight to London for freedom, they are surprised at the terrorists extreme inhumanity and one of them is taken hostage as a "VIP" target to be held until they get to London. Seemingly out of options, Anshul asks their airport contact to take them to an under-construction terminal so they can view the proceedings; however this is a ruse as Anshul reveals his knowledge of the contact's betrayal and ties her up. Disguising themselves as airport workers, they take advantage of a sandstorm to get on the field, free the VIPs, and capture the terrorists, redirecting the charter flight to India. The leader of Dubai denies them take off clearance at first, but after Anshul explains how their methods fit in with Dubai's humanism, he grants it. In India, the terrorists are booked, with Zia and the ISI leaders huffing in disgrace, and the flight is returned, with all on board safe and sound and reunited with their families. In the end, it is revealed that Radhika was actually working for RAW and had informed them of her husband's abilities and background in the first place.

Cast 

 Akshay Kumar as Anshul Malhotra / RAW Agent Bell Bottom 
 Vaani Kapoor as RAW Agent Radhika Malhotra, Anshul's wife    
 Lara Dutta as PM Indira Gandhi
 Huma Qureshi as ISI Agent Adeela Rehman
 Siddhant Ghegadmal as Harish Salgaonkar
 Adil Hussain as N. F. Santook, Anshul's boss
 Denzil Smith as R. N. Kao
 Aniruddh Dave as Sameer "Puchchi" Mehra
Thalaivasal Vijay as P. V. Narasimha Rao
 Zain Khan Durrani as  Daljeet "Doddy" Singh aka Doddy, a terrorist and the main antagonist
 Dolly Ahluwalia as Raavi Malhotra, Anshul's mother
 Mamik Singh as Ashish "Aashu" Malhotra, Anshul's brother
 Abhijit Lahiri as Khurshed Alam Khan
 Sumit Kaul as Dollar
 Sunit Tandon as ISI Chief
 Sanat Sawant as Raj
 Jatin Negi as Sundar
 Akash as Agent
 Amit Kumar Vashisth as Saand
 Kavi Raj as Gen. Muhammad Zia-ul-Haq
 Husam Chadat as Farhad Bin Sultan
 Anjali Dinesh Anand as Anshul’s sister-In-Law
 Ashok Chhabra as Morarji Desai
 Balram Gupta as Home Minister
 Girish Sharma as Anshul's friend
 Nitin Khanna as Dubai Policeman
 Karim Saidi as Abu Mukhtar
 Deesh Mariwala as Tejeshwar
 Ahmed Yahya Berrada as IB Official Of Dubai

Production
The film was officially announced in November 2019. Subjected on true events, Bell Bottom is set during 1980s about some unforgettable heroes of the era. It became the first film to begin shooting post COVID-19 pandemic in India. Principal photography was completed in a one-shot schedule from 20 August to 30 September 2020 in Glasgow, Scotland and London.

Release

The film was initially set for theatrical release on 22 January 2021 but got later shifted to 2 April, then 28 May and later 27 July 2021 but faced delays due to the COVID-19 pandemic. Post the second wave of the pandemic, it was the first film to release theatrically without Maharashtra cinemas that were closed at that time. The film released on 19 August 2021 in 3D. It was released on Amazon Prime Video on 16 September, and in Maharashtra cinemas on 22 October 2021.

Soundtrack 

The film score is composed by Daniel B. George while Julius Packiam composed the trailer score. The songs featured in the film are composed by Amaal Mallik, Tanishk Bagchi, Shantanu Dutta, Gurnazar and Maninder Buttar while lyrics are written by Rashmi Virag, Tanishk Bagchi, Babbu Maan, Maninder Buttar, Seema Saini and Gurnazar.

The song Sakhiyan2.0 was a remake of the 2018 Punjabi song Sakhiyan by Maninder Buttar.

Box office 
Bell Bottom earned 2.75 crore at the domestic box office on its opening day. On the second day, the film collected 8.60 crore. On the third day, the film collected 3 crore. On the fourth day, the film collected 36.40 crore, taking total opening weekend domestic collection to 52.75 crore.

As of 1 October 2021, The film grossed 36.46 crore in India and 14.12 crore overseas, the film has a worldwide gross collection of 50.58 crore.

Reception
On review aggregator Rotten Tomatoes, it holds a rating of 58%.
Suchin Mehrotra writing for Film Companion criticised the screenplay of the movie saying that “in the end, somewhere buried within Bell Bottom are the building blocks of a great thriller. It’s just shrouded in simplistic storytelling and ‘hijacked’ by the pressures of the big Hindi movie formula.” Monika Rawal Kukreja of The Hindustan Times praised the film for being an edge-of-the-seat thriller.

Controversy
The film was banned in three Gulf countries, namely Saudi Arabia, Kuwait and Qatar. The film certification authorities banned it on grounds of tampering with historical facts. It was pointed out that the 1984 incident actually had the United Arab Emirates Defence Minister Mohammed bin Rashid Al Maktoum and the UAE authorities getting the hijackers, while the film portrayed Kumar's character and his team as the real heroes of the mission.

See also 

 Bell-bottoms
 1980s in Indian fashion
 1980 in India
 Operation Tupac
 List of accidents and incidents involving airliners by location#India
 List of accidents and incidents involving airliners by airline (D–O)#I

References

External links 

 

Film productions suspended due to the COVID-19 pandemic
Films about aircraft hijackings
Films set on airplanes
Indian films based on actual events
Hindi-language action films
2020s Hindi-language films
Indian action thriller films
Indian spy thriller films
Indian spy action films
Cultural depictions of Indira Gandhi
Indian aviation films
Films set in airports
2021 action thriller films
Indian 3D films
2021 3D films
Films directed by Ranjit M Tewari